Igor Kozyr (born 3 August 1966) is a Belarusian wrestler. He competed in the men's freestyle 74 kg at the 1996 Summer Olympics.

References

1966 births
Living people
Belarusian male sport wrestlers
Olympic wrestlers of Belarus
Wrestlers at the 1996 Summer Olympics
Sportspeople from Gomel
20th-century Belarusian people